Spurinna may refer to:

 Titus Vestricius Spurinna (c. 24–after 105 AD), two-time Roman consul and friend of Pliny the Younger
 Members of the gens Spurinnia
 Spurinna, a haruspex who warned Julius Caesar about the Ides of March